Temeleuţi may refer to several places in Moldova:

Temeleuţi, Călăraşi, a commune in Călăraşi district
Temeleuţi, Floreşti, a commune in Floreşti district

See also 
 Temelia, a village in Gura Văii, Bacău Commune, Bacău County, Romania